Patrik Riley may refer to:

G. Patrick Riley, artist, art educator and mask maker
Pat Riley (born 1945), American basketball executive, former coach and player
Pat Riley (Saturday Night Live), fictional character
Patrick Riley, American musician formerly of The Ataris
Patrick T. Riley (1941–2015), American political theorist

See also
Patrick Reilly (disambiguation)